is a Japanese anime series that combined episodes of two series,  and . It was broadcast in 13 episodes between July 5, 2005 and September 27, 2005.

Summary
In Love Pheromones, Aimi and Kaoruko are wannabe comedians and heroes of justice. As their manager, Tomokazu Seki, attempts to find them a job so they can rise to superstardom, they take part-time jobs as superheroine duo "Love Pheromones". They battle various evil, but as they destroy half the city every time, this leads to them being mistaken for evil creatures and feared by everyone.

The other half of the show, Heretic Girls Squad tells the story of the five Hokke sisters, who were abandoned by their now-deceased parents, and live in perpetual poverty. The family consists of, from oldest to youngest, Otone, Maika, Yoku, Kanashi, and Utano. One day, they release Akumako, an imp who was sealed in a vase left behind by their father. Akumako tells them that their parents belonged to an evil organisation, and that to carry on their parents' wishes, they must become "evil". To attempt this, they become the Gedou Otome Tai, a team of Magical Girls bent on carrying out evil. Unfortunately, all their efforts end up helping somebody, and they are mistakenly thought of as heroes.

A recurring theme in Akahori Gedou Hour Rabuge is mistaken identity: both groups of girls are thought of as villains and heroes respectively. Another theme is following one's dreams, whether they are of being the world's greatest evil or being a famous comedy duo and having legions of fans.

Episode lists
Most of the episodes consist of two stories, one for Aimi and Kaoruko (Love Pheromones) and one for the Hokke sisters (Heretic Girls Squad), although occasionally they meet and interact with each other. In episodes 12 and 13, the stories merge into one as both groups act together against a common enemy.

External links
Official Gedou Akahori Gedou Hour Rabuge website 

Magical girl anime and manga
Comedy anime and manga
Anime with original screenplays